Oru Kuppai Kathai is a 2018 Indian Tamil-language drama film produced by Ramadhoss, Aravindan, and Aslam. It was written and directed by debutant Kaali Rangaswamy. The film stars dance choreographer  Dinesh in his debut as lead actor with Manisha Yadav and Yogi Babu in lead roles. The film's music was composed by Joshua Sridhar with cinematography by Mahesh Muthuswami and editing by Gopi Krishna. The film was released in 25 May 2018 to neutral to positive reviews from critics.

Plot
Kumar (Dinesh) is a poor garbage collector from the slums who is in search for a bride. But many brides rejected him due to his love and passion towards garbage collecting. One day, he meets Poongodi (Manisha Yadav), a girl from a middle class family in Ooty whose father (George Maryan) lied to her that Kumar is a merchant. Poongodi, who believes that Kumar is a merchant, decides to marry him and settle in Chennai. Weeks after marriage, Poongodi discovers that Kumar is not a merchant but a garbage collector, causing a hatred towards him. Kumar tries to make things right by shifting from the slums to an apartment with family, including their newborn baby girl. In the apartment, Kumar befriends his neighbor Arjun (Sujo Mathew), a software developer who has been helping him shift to their new home. However, months after shifting, Poongodi and Arjun later fall in love with each other and start a romantic and extramarital affair. Meanwhile, Kumar decides to resign as a garbage collector for Poongodi's sake and decides to surprise her with the news, but later, he realises that she and their baby are not at home. Later, the watchman told him that Poongodi is having an affair with Arjun and that she might have eloped with him somewhere far away, leaving Kumar in shock, despair, and depression. The rest of the story follows how Kumar becomes a drunkard and failure in life, while Poongodi and Arjun start a new life in a mansion.

Cast
Dinesh as Kumar
Manisha Yadav as Poongodi
Sujo Mathew as Arjun
Yogi Babu as Kumar's friend
George Maryan as Poongodi's father
Aadhira Pandilakshmi as Kumar's mother
Kiran

Soundtrack
The soundtrack was composed by Joshua Sridhar and lyrics written by Na. Muthukumar & Sulaiman fazil. The audio was released under Think Music.
"Vilagadhe Enadhuyire" – Haricharan
"Ninaithadhu Ellam" – Saicharan
"Vaa Machi" – Velumurugan
"Kuppai Vandiyil" – Saicharan
"Mazhai Pozhindhidum" – Madhu Iyer

Critical reception
The Times of India wrote "Director Kaali Rangasami has in his hands a good script, and almost succeeds in narrating a true-to-life story." Behindwoods wrote "Oru Kuppai Kadhai is the kind of script that has the substance to do well, but whose execution falls just above average." The Hindu wrote "Director Kaali Rangasamy's Oru Kuppai Kadhai would have made a better book than a film. The storyline is enough to keep you interested." News Minute wrote "The film's title Oru Kuppai Kathai perhaps alludes to its flawed characters but falls short of leaving an impact." Sify wrote "Overall, Oru Kuppa Kathai is a topical subject that deals with the extramarital affair and its pitfalls. The first half is ok, it is second half which becomes like a never ending serial." Baradwaj Rangan wrote, "An inconsistent story about a wife who strays is redeemed by its compassion".

References

External links 

 

2018 films
Indian drama films
Films scored by Joshua Sridhar